Micrandra spruceana is a species of tree in the family Euphorbiaceae. It is native to South America.

References

Crotonoideae
Trees of Peru
Trees of Brazil
Trees of Colombia
Taxa named by Henri Ernest Baillon
Taxa named by Richard Evans Schultes